Aglyptodactylus securifer is a species of frog in the family Mantellidae. It is endemic to Madagascar, where it lives in forests.

This species was described to science in 1998. Its upper surfaces are silver-gray to beige in color with gray bands on the legs. The undersides are yellow and the belly is white. The eyes are golden yellow with black pupils.

References

Aglyptodactylus
Endemic frogs of Madagascar
Amphibians described in 1998
Taxonomy articles created by Polbot